Bassin may refer to:

People
 Elieser Bassin (1840–1898), British Israelist
 Mark Bassin, British geographer
 Sherwood Bassin (born 1939), Canadian ice hockey executive

Other uses
 The Grand Bassin, the largest body of open water along the Canal du Midi

See also
 Basin (disambiguation)
 Bassein (disambiguation)
 Bassins, Switzerland